Los Angeles, Texas could refer to:
Los Angeles, La Salle County, Texas, an unincorporated community
Los Angeles, Willacy County, Texas, a census-designated place

See also
Los Angeles (disambiguation)